Chayanne  is the third album from Puerto Rican artist Chayanne, released on Sony on 1987, and his first album under that label.

Album history
Chayanne is the first album by the singer released by CBS Columbia (now Sony Music Entretaiment) and was produced by Ronnie Foster. "Fiesta En America" and "Peligro de Amor" peaked at number four on the Billboard Hot Latin Tracks chart. "Fiesta En America" ranked 49th in the 2008 recap for the '100 Greatest Songs of the 80's in Spanish' by VH1 Latin America. In 1988, the album was released in Portuguese for Brazil which included "Não Posso Mais Viver Assim", a Portuguese cover of the Italian song "L'Amore È Quando Non C'è Più", originally performed by the Italian singer Euro Cristiani in 1979. The song was never released version in Spanish. In the 1988 Spanish version re-release, the song, "Una Luna Para Dos", was removed and replaced with "Esperanza". The album was reissued on Compact Disc on December 28, 1989.

Track listing

Music videos
Fiesta En America
Digo No
Para Tenerte Otra Vez
Peligro de Amor
Tu y Yo
Violeta
Te Deseo
Una Luna Para Dos

Personnel
Ronnie Foster — Producer, Arranger, Choral Arranger ("Tu y Yo" only)
Oscar Goméz — Associated Producer, Choral Arranger
Eddie del Barrio — Arranger
Keith Seppanen — Sound Engineer
Jorge del Barrio — String Arranger

Singles

Release history

1987 albums
Chayanne albums
Spanish-language albums